The Order of Friendship of Peoples is a state award of the Republic of Belarus. It is the highest award of the Republic of Belarus for foreign citizens.

Statute of the order 
The Order of Friendship of Peoples is awarded to citizens:

 for a significant contribution to the strengthening of peace, friendly relations and cooperation between states, the consolidation of society and the unity of peoples;
 for especially fruitful activities for the convergence and mutual enrichment of national cultures;
 for high achievements in international public, charitable and humanitarian activities;
 for a great personal contribution to the development and multiplication of the spiritual and intellectual potential of the Republic of Belarus, active work to protect human rights and his social interests;
 for special services in the development of foreign economic activity, democracy and social progress.

The Order of Friendship of Peoples is worn on a neck ribbon.

Notable recipients (partial list)

Belarus 
 Pyotr Klimuk

Post-USSR nations 

 Vladimir Putin, President of Russia
 Boris Gromov, Soviet-Russian general
 Yury Luzhkov, Mayor of Moscow
 Patriarch Alexy II of Moscow
 Valentina Matviyenko
 Gennady Zyuganov, General Secretary of the Russian Communist Party
 Ramzan Kadyrov, Head of the Chechen Republic
 Borys Paton, former head of the National Academy of Sciences of Ukraine
 Ilýa Weljanow, Turkmen diplomat and Soviet general
Ilham Aliyev, President of Azerbaijan
Kurmanbek Bakiyev, President of Kyrgyzstan
Nursultan Nazarbayev, President of Kazakhstan
Karim Massimov, Prime Minister of Kazakhstan

Other nations 

 Cao Gangchuan, chairman of the Central Military Commission and former Minister of National Defense of the People's Republic of China.
 Hugo Chávez, President of Venezuela
René Fasel, president of the International Ice Hockey Federation.
Abdel Fattah el-Sisi, President of EgyptЛукашенко наградил Президента Египта орденом Дружбы народов
Tomislav Nikolić, President of Serbia

See also 

 Orders, decorations, and medals of Belarus

References 

Orders, decorations, and medals of Belarus